is a Japanese former Nippon Professional Baseball infielder.

References 

1969 births
Living people
Baseball people from Aichi Prefecture 
Japanese baseball players
Nippon Professional Baseball infielders
Nippon Professional Baseball outfielders
Managers of baseball teams in Japan